Leandro Corrieri de Macedo (born March 18, 1968 in Porto Alegre, Rio Grande do Sul) is an athlete from Brazil, who competes in triathlon. He won the inaugural event at the 1995 Pan American Games in Mar del Plata.

Macedo competed at the first Olympic triathlon at the 2000 Summer Olympics.  He took fourteenth place with a total time of 1:49:50.69.

Four years later, at the 2004 Summer Olympics, Macedo competed again.  He placed thirty-first with a time of 1:57:39.36.

References

1968 births
Living people
Brazilian male triathletes
Olympic triathletes of Brazil
Triathletes at the 1995 Pan American Games
Triathletes at the 1999 Pan American Games
Triathletes at the 2000 Summer Olympics
Triathletes at the 2003 Pan American Games
Triathletes at the 2004 Summer Olympics
Brazilian people of Italian descent
Pan American Games gold medalists for Brazil
Pan American Games medalists in triathlon
South American Games gold medalists for Brazil
South American Games medalists in triathlon
Competitors at the 2002 South American Games
Medalists at the 1995 Pan American Games
20th-century Brazilian people